New Old Songs is a remix album by American rap rock band Limp Bizkit. Released on December 4, 2001, the album contains hip hop remixes of songs from the band's albums Three Dollar Bill, Yall; Significant Other; and Chocolate Starfish and the Hot Dog Flavored Water. The album is also the sixteenth best-selling remix album of all time.

Music and lyrics 

The sound of New Old Songs is predominantly based in hip hop music, in particular rap infused with rock music styles and culture. The album compiles remixes of songs from Three Dollar Bill, Yall, Significant Other and Chocolate Starfish and the Hot Dog Flavored Water. This album's remix of "Faith", a cover of the George Michael song, incorporates elements of David Bowie's song "Fame" and a newly recorded rap verse by Everlast.

Critical reception 

Despite having no singles released, it achieved Gold certification by the RIAA in February 2002 in the US. The album peaked at #26 on the Billboard 200. Allmusic writer Bradley Torreano panned the album, writing "Most of these songs could have even survived the remix if the choruses, which are an important part of the Bizkit formula, retained their massive riffing and awesome production." Torreano appraised three of the album's tracks: Fred Durst and Josh Abraham's remix of "Faith", DJ Premier's remix of "My Way" and Butch Vig's "Nookie" remix. Describing Vig's "Nookie" remix, Torreano said that it might be the album's best track, writing that it "sounds more like Fatboy Slim with its thick beat and dirty keyboard". The Rolling Stone Album Guide awarded the album two out of five stars. In The Essential Rock Discography, Martin Charles Strong gave the compilation a 5 out of 10 rating.

Track listing

Charts

Weekly charts

Year-end charts

Certifications

References 

Limp Bizkit compilation albums
Albums produced by William Orbit
Albums produced by Butch Vig
Albums produced by Timbaland
Albums produced by the Neptunes
Albums produced by DJ Premier
2001 remix albums
Flip Records (1994) albums
Interscope Records remix albums